Christiaan Cicek (born 3 December 1988 in Hengelo) is a Dutch footballer of Assyrian descent who plays as a striker for FC Suryoye-Mediterraneo.

Club career
Christiaan Cicek's professional debut was on 12 September 2011 for FC Zwolle against Helmond Sport. Before Christiaan Cicek came to PEC Zwolle he did a soccer internship for Syrianska FC.

In September 2015, he joined Dutch amateur side FC Suryoye-Mediterraneo from German team Spvgg Vreden.

References 

1988 births
Living people
Sportspeople from Hengelo
Dutch footballers
Dutch people of Assyrian/Syriac descent
Association football forwards
Excelsior '31 players
Eerste Divisie players
Eredivisie players
PEC Zwolle players
SV Zwaluwen Wierden players
FC Lienden players
Assyrian footballers
Footballers from Overijssel